Bernardo d'Almeida (born 6 August 1912, date of death unknown) was a Portuguese sailor. He competed in the Dragon event at the 1956 Summer Olympics.

References

External links
 

1912 births
Year of death missing
Portuguese male sailors (sport)
Olympic sailors of Portugal
Sailors at the 1956 Summer Olympics – Dragon
Sportspeople from Lisbon